Lieutenant General Aldo C. Schellenberg  is a Swiss professional military officer. He is the head of the Air Force and the designated deputy of the Swiss Chief of the Armed Forces.

Personal life and education
Schellenberg attended school in Bülach and then completed his secondary education at Kantonsschule Zürcher Unterland after passing Matura type C exams in 1979. He went on to study economics at the University of Zurich, graduating in 1986. From 1986 to 1991, he worked as an assistant at the Institute for Business Research at the University of Zurich.  In 1991, he studied for his doctorate under the supervision of Edwin Rühli, receiving the academic title Dr. oec. publ. (Doctor of Economics) in 1991.

Aldo Schellenberg is married and has four children.

Business career
From 1992 to 2011, he was the owner of a business consulting company, which is now run by his wife. Schellenberg's professional experience proved significant during the 2007 Swissair trial, in which executives were accused of and later cleared of charges related to accounting practices. In addition, from 2003 to 2011, Schellenberg was a lecturer at Bern University's Institute for Corporate Accounting and Controlling. From 2006 to 2009, he completed a postgraduate degree in commercial law at Bern University, resulting in a LL.M. degree.

Military service
As of 1 July 2010, Schellenberg worked part-time (60%) as commander of the Swiss Army's Mountain Infantry Brigade 12. On January 1, 2012, he was promoted to divisionär (major general) as chief of staff of the army.

On 1 January 2013, he succeeded Markus Gygax as commander of the Swiss Air Force.  At its meeting on 22 March 2017, the Swiss Federal Council promoted Schellenberg to Chief of Operations of the Swiss Army, effective 1 January 2018.

In spring 2016, the new Federal Councillor Guy Parmelin stopped the procurement of a new air defense system, because the project group, headed by  Schellenberg, proposed a system which did not fulfil requirements.

Military positions and ranks
As a militia officer, Aldo Schellenberg has held the following positions:

 1990: Captain: Commander of a Fortified Airman's Staff Battery
 1994: Captain: Chief of Staff of Mountain Division 12
 1997: Major in the General Staff: Commander of the Light Air Defense Division 12
 2000: Oberstleutnant in the Generalstab: Deputy Chief of Staff of the Gebirgsdivision 12
 2001: Oberst (colonel) of the General Staff: Staff of the Mountain Division 12
 2004: Colonel in the General Staff: Stabschef of the Gebirgsinfanteriebrigade 12
 2008: Colonel in the General Staff: Assigned staff officer in the staff of the Mountain Infantry Brigade 12
 2010: Brigadier: Commander of the Mountain Infantry Brigade 12
 2012: Divisional general: Chief of the Armestab
 2013: Lieutenant General: Commander of the Swiss Air Force

Decorations and awards
Source:

References

External links

Heads of the Swiss Air Force since 1914
 Official Page about Aldo C. Schellenberg

1958 births
Living people
Swiss generals
Swiss Air Force personnel